Ottaviano Garibaldi Misefari, better known as Ottavio Misefari (1 February 1909 – 6 January 1999) was an Italian association football player and manager.

In February 1925 he was the first player in history (along with Pasquale Rattotti) to move from Reggina to Messina, two rival teams in Italy (they play the "Derby dello Stretto").

Misefari was the Reggina manager during the 1944-1945 season.

References 

1909 births
1999 deaths
Sportspeople from the Metropolitan City of Reggio Calabria
Italian footballers
Italian football managers
Reggina 1914 managers
Reggina 1914 players
Association football forwards
Footballers from Calabria